A first day of issue cover or first day cover (FDC) is a postage stamp on a cover, postal card or stamped envelope franked on the first day the issue is authorized for use within the country or territory of the stamp-issuing authority. Sometimes the issue is made from a temporary or permanent foreign or overseas office. Covers that are postmarked at sea or their next port of call will carry a Paquebot postmark. There will usually be a first day of issue postmark, frequently a pictorial cancellation, indicating the city and date where the item was first issued, and "first day of issue" is often used to refer to this postmark. Depending on the policy of the nation issuing the stamp, official first day postmarks may sometimes be applied to covers weeks or months after the date indicated.

Postal authorities may hold a first day ceremony to generate publicity for the new issue, with postal officials revealing the stamp, and with connected persons in attendance, such as descendants of the person being honored by the stamp. The ceremony may also be held in a location that has a special connection with the stamp's subject, such as the birthplace of a social movement, or at a stamp show.

History

Prior to 1840, postage costs were very high and they were usually paid by the person who received the mail.  The cost was measured by how many sheets were in the letter and how far the letter had to go. Sometimes this amounted to a very considerable sum. Sir Rowland Hill calculated that the cost to the Post Office was far less than what some people were paying to send/receive their mail; this figure was just a fraction of 1d. Hill believed that sending mail should be affordable to all so proposed that postage should be pre-paid, based on the weight rather than the number of sheets and the cost should be drastically reduced. On 10 January 1840 a Uniform 1d postmark was released which allowed a universal penny postage rate, this was a postmark that was paid and was applied when the letter was sent. It was later decided that an adhesive label should be used to prevent forgeries and mis-use of the postal service and the Penny Black stamp was born. It was officially released for sale on 6 May 1840; however, several post offices that received the stamps prior to that date released the stamps early. The City of Bath is known for releasing the stamps on 2 May 1840. Here began the very first First Day Covers.

Types

Event covers

Event covers, also known as commemorative covers, instead of marking the issuance of a stamp, commemorate events. A design on the left side of the envelope (a "cachet") explains the event or anniversary being celebrated. Ideally the stamp or stamps affixed relate to the event. Cancels are obtained either from the location (e.g., Cape Canaveral, Anytown) or, in the case of the United States, from the Postal Service's Cancellation Services unit in Kansas City.

Philatelic covers

Philatelic covers are envelope prepared with a stamp(s), addressed and sent through the mail delivery system to create a collectible item. Information about philatelic covers is available online in catalogs and collector websites.

Other types
Computer vended postage stamps issued by Neopost had first-day-of-issue ceremonies sponsored by the company, not by an official stamp-issuing entity.  Personalised postage stamps of different designs are sometimes also given first-day-of-issue ceremonies and cancellations by the private designer.  The stamps issued by private local posts can also have first days of issue, as can artistamps.

Features of a cover

Postmark

The postmark is one of the most important features of a cover. Stamps are cancelled by a postmark, which shows they have been used and can’t be re-used to send a letter. Circular Date Stamps (CDS) are the 'bread-and-butter' postmarks used on everyday mail by Post Office counters across the UK. A CDS postmark is very straight forward and only features the town’s name and the date. There is no picture. If one wanted to use a CDS postmark from a town relevant to the stamp's issue, one would have to go to the town’s local Post Office to get it. On a cover, the postmark should touch each stamp and link them to the envelope.
Postmarks came to the foreground in the early 1960s, when collectors started to demand more interesting cancellations on their first day covers. For the Red Cross issue in 1963, a special Florence Nightingale cover was posted at her birthplace, West Wellow. The Botanical Conference issue of 1964 featured primroses on the stamps, so one clever cover dealer posted his covers at Primrose Valley. This kind of relevant postmark made a cover worth often ten times more than the same cover with a standard postmark issued by the Philatelic Bureau at Edinburgh (a place with no connection to the stamps).  In the US, the U.S. Postal Service chooses a city, or several, as 'official' first day cities. These have a special connection to the stamp issue being released, and these postmarks are the only ones that have the wording: 'First Day of Issue'

Special handstamps

With postmarks becoming more and more important to the covers, pictorial postmarks became very popular. Pictorial postmarks are also known as Special Handstamps/Postmarks. In 1924, the first commemorative set of stamps for the British Empire Exhibition had both special postmarks and a special slogan, but it was not until the late 1960s and early 1970s that dealers and organisations really caught on that you could sponsor/design a connected postmark and it would make an ordinary cover something special. These days anyone can sponsor a postmark. They need to design the postmark, get it approved by Royal Mail and then pay a fee. The postmark then becomes the property of Royal Mail and anyone is allowed to use it on their covers. This means that to a certain extent, most cover producers “borrow” other people’s postmarks. However, to be an “official” cover, a postmark has to be on the cover produced by the organisation that sponsored the postmark in the first place.

Cachet
As the collecting of first day covers became more popular they began to appear on prepared envelopes, often with an illustration (commonly referred to by collectors as a cachet) that corresponded with the theme of the stamp. Several printing companies began producing such envelopes and often hired free lance illustrators to design their cachets such as Charles R. Chickering who in his earlier years designed postage stamps for the U.S. Post Office. Cachets, which should not be confused with postmarks, are basically rubber stamps. Postmarks can only be applied by official Post Offices whereas anyone can design a cachet and put it on their cover. A cachet makes a cover unique and helps tell the story of the cover.  It can say whether the cover was carried (for example, covers were carried on the very last flight of the Concorde), who the signer was or information about the postmark. Royal Mail no longer counts pre-decimal stamps as valid and won’t postmark them, a cachet can therefore be used to cancel a pre-decimal stamp on a cover. It provides a link between that stamp and the envelope. They can also be used to cancel Cinderella stamps.

See also
 Earliest reported postmark on stamped envelopes

References

Sources

External links 
 

Envelopes
Philatelic terminology
Postal markings
Stamp collecting